Jacques Edmond Brossard (born April 24, 1933) is a Canadian former diplomat. He was Chargé d'affaires a.i. to Haiti.

External links 
Foreign Affairs and International Trade Canada Complete List of Posts 
Jacques Edmond Brossard's profile at The Canadian Encyclopedia

Ambassadors of Canada to Haiti
1933 births
Living people